The Mifflin Elementary School in the Lincoln Place neighborhood of Pittsburgh, Pennsylvania is a building from 1932. It was listed on the National Register of Historic Places in 1986.

References

School buildings on the National Register of Historic Places in Pennsylvania
Moderne architecture in Pennsylvania
School buildings completed in 1932
Schools in Pittsburgh
City of Pittsburgh historic designations
Pittsburgh History & Landmarks Foundation Historic Landmarks
National Register of Historic Places in Pittsburgh
1932 establishments in Pennsylvania